Aglossa steralis is a species of snout moth in the genus Aglossa. It was described by Cajetan Felder, Rudolf Felder and Alois Friedrich Rogenhofer in 1875 and is known from South Africa (it was described from Grahamtown).

References

Endemic moths of South Africa
Moths described in 1875
Pyralini
Moths of Africa
Taxa named by Alois Friedrich Rogenhofer